Unlock (stylized as UNLOCK) is the debut Japanese studio album by South Korean band Day6, which was released on October 17, 2018. The album features 10 tracks, including the singles If -Mata Aetara- and Stop The Rain. The album peaked at number 21 on Oricon Charts.

Background and release
In January 2018, it was revealed that Day6 would make their Japanese debut with the release of the single "If -Mata Aetara-" on March 14. They released their second Japanese single album Stop the Rain, produced by Shinichi Ubukata, on July 25. Breaking Down, the title track of the album, was released along with a music video in September (one month prior the release of the album) as a promotional track.

Members Sungjin, Jae, Young K and Wonpil participated in the writing of the lyrics and all members, including Dowoon, participated in producing the tracks. The album only includes original songs as it does not feature Japanese versions of Day6's songs.

Track listing

Editions
There are seven versions of this album available: the Regular Edition, the Limited Edition and five version of the Picture Label Edition.
 Regular Edition (WPCL-12947): This edition includes the CD and a 24-page booklet
 Limited Edition (WPZL-31524): This edition comes with a DVD and a 24-page booklet.
 Picture Label Edition: This edition includes the CD only.
 Sungjin ver. (WPCL-12948)
 Jae ver. (WPCL-12949)
 Young K ver. (WPCL-12950)
 Wonpil ver. (WPCL-12951)
 Dowoon ver. (WPCL-12952)

Charts

Sales

Album

Singles

"If -Mata Aetara-"

"Stop The Rain"

Release history

References

External links
 
 
 

2018 debut albums
Day6 albums
Warner Music Japan albums
Japanese-language albums